Neopolyptychus is a genus of moths in the family Sphingidae first described by Robert Herbert Carcasson in 1968.

Species
Neopolyptychus ancylus (Rothschild & Jordan, 1916)
Neopolyptychus centralis Basquin & Pierre, 2005
Neopolyptychus choveti Pierre, 2004
Neopolyptychus compar (Rothschild & Jordan 1903)
Neopolyptychus consimilis (Rothschild & Jordan 1903)
Neopolyptychus convexus (Rothschild & Jordan 1903)
Neopolyptychus prionites (Rothschild & Jordan 1916)
Neopolyptychus pygarga (Karsch 1891)
Neopolyptychus serrator (Jordan 1929)
Neopolyptychus spurrelli (Rothschild & Jordan, 1912)

References

 
Smerinthini
Moth genera
Taxa named by Robert Herbert Carcasson